What's Up, Tiger Lily? is a 1966 American comedy film directed by Woody Allen in his feature-length directorial debut.

Allen took a Japanese spy film, International Secret Police: Key of Keys (1965), and overdubbed it with completely original dialogue that had nothing to do with the plot of the original film. By putting in new scenes and rearranging the order of existing scenes, he completely changed the tone of the film from a James Bond clone into a comedy about the search for the world's best egg salad recipe.

During post-production, Allen's original one-hour television version was expanded without his permission to include additional scenes from International Secret Police: A Barrel of Gunpowder, the third film in the International Secret Police series, and musical numbers by the band the Lovin' Spoonful. The band released a soundtrack album. Louise Lasser, who was married to Allen at the time, served as one of the voice actors for the "new" dialogue soundtrack, as did Mickey Rose, Allen's writing partner on Take the Money and Run (1969) and Bananas (1971). In 2003, Image released the film on DVD, with both the theatrical and television (called "alternate") soundtracks.

Plot
The plot provides the setup for a string of sight gags, puns, jokes based on Asian stereotypes, and general farce. The central plot involves the misadventures of secret agent Phil Moskowitz, hired by the Grand Exalted High Macha of Rashpur ("a nonexistent but real-sounding country") to recover a secret egg salad recipe that was stolen from him. The recipe, in the possession of gangster Shepherd Wong, is also being sought by rival gangster Wing Fat, and Moskowitz, assisted by two female Rashpur agents, temporarily teams up with Wing Fat to steal the recipe from Wong.

The movie has an ending credits scene unrelated to the plot, in which China Lee, a Playboy Playmate and wife of Allen's comic idol Mort Sahl who does not appear elsewhere in the film, does a striptease while Allen (who is also on-screen) explains that he promised he would put her in the film somewhere.

Cast

Soundtrack album

The soundtrack album to What's Up, Tiger Lily? was released in 1966. It contains music by the Lovin' Spoonful. The audio engineer at National Recording Studios was Fred Weinberg, who went on to produce and engineer many other films and albums. It was re-released on CD along with You're a Big Boy Now, the Spoonful's soundtrack for the 1966 film by Francis Ford Coppola. It reached No. 126 on the Billboard Pop Albums charts.

Track listing
All tracks written by John Sebastian, Joe Butler, Steve Boone and Zal Yanovsky, except where noted.

Side one
 "Introduction to Flick" (Woody Allen, Lenny Maxwell) – 2:03
 "Pow (Theme From 'What's Up, Tiger Lily?')" (Sebastian, Butler, Boone, Skip Boone, Yanovsky) – 2:28
 "Gray Prison Blues" – 2:15
 "Pow Revisited" (Sebastian, Butler, Boone, Yanovsky, Skip Boone) – 2:30
 "Unconscious Minuet" – 2:05
 "Fishin' Blues" (trad., arrangement by Sebastian) – 1:58

Side two
 "Respoken" (Sebastian) – 1:48
 "Cool Million" – 2:20
 "Speakin' of Spoken" (Sebastian) – 2:40
 "Lookin' to Spy" – 2:30
 "Phil's Love Theme" – 2:15
 "End Title" – 4:05

Reception
The reviews were mixed upon the film's release. Expressing disappointment in the movie, The New York Times stated that "the peppery English sound track wears thin as the action churns around in absolute chaos." Variety wrote, "The production has one premise — deliberately mismatched dialog — which is sustained reasonably well through its brief running time."

Aggregator Rotten Tomatoes reports 81% approval of the film from 26 reviews, with an average rating of 6.9/10.

The film is considered Woody Allen's directorial debut, although Allen distanced himself from it in a 2020 interview.

It has been noted that it is not Allen's voice we hear at the end of the movie.  In an interview with Brett Homenick, S. Richard Krown - the credited film editor - admitted that the voice was his own.

See also
List of American films of 1966
Mad Movies with the L.A. Connection
Kung Pow! Enter the Fist

References

External links

 
 
 
 
 
 DVD review and film's production history

1966 films
American International Pictures films
American parody films
American spy comedy films
Collage film
Films directed by Woody Allen
Films with screenplays by Woody Allen
Self-reflexive films
1960s spy comedy films
1960s parody films
1966 directorial debut films
1966 comedy films
Japan in non-Japanese culture
Alternative versions of films
1960s English-language films
1960s American films